Guangxi Beibu Gulf Airlines, or simply GX Airlines, is a Chinese airline based at Nanning Wuxu International Airport. It is a joint venture between Tianjin Airlines and the Guangxi Beibu Gulf Investment Group. GX Airlines commenced operations on 13 February 2015 as one of the first airlines based in Guangxi.

History 
GX Airlines is a joint venture between Tianjin Airlines and the Guangxi Beibu Gulf Investment Group. Tianjin Airlines has a 70% (21 billion yuan) stake and the investment group has a 30% (9 billion yuan) stake in the airline. GX Airlines received its first aircraft, an Embraer 190 leased from Tianjin Airlines, and its air operator's certificate on 1 February 2015.

The airline conducted its first flight on 13 February of the same year, between its base of Nanning and Haikou, Hainan Province.

In November 2015, GX Airlines inducted its first foreign pilots. GX Airlines also plans to begin flights to Hong Kong, Taiwan, Macau and destinations in Northeast and Southeast Asia.

Destinations 

As of January 2017, GX Airlines flies to 44 destinations in China  and also to Bangkok, Thailand.

Fleet 
, the GX Airlines fleet consists of the following aircraft:

References

External links 
 

Airlines of China
Airlines established in 2015
Companies based in Guangxi
HNA Group
Chinese brands